Eric Helgar (8 February 1910 – 14 June 1992) was a German singer and film actor. He was married to the actress Lola Müthel.

Selected filmography
 What Women Dream (1933)
 The Champion of Pontresina (1934)
 Orders Are Orders (1936)
 The Green Emperor (1939)
 A Woman Like You (1939)
 Friedemann Bach (1941)
 Romance in a Minor Key (1943)

References

Bibliography
 Goble, Alan. The Complete Index to Literary Sources in Film. Walter de Gruyter, 1999.

External links

1910 births
1992 deaths
German male film actors
20th-century German male singers
Musicians from Regensburg